Hulls Crossing is an unincorporated community located in the town of Russell, Sheboygan County, Wisconsin, United States.
The community was named for J. D. Hull, the original owner of the town site.

Notes

Unincorporated communities in Sheboygan County, Wisconsin
Unincorporated communities in Wisconsin